Steve Goepel (born January 22, 1949) is a former American football quarterback in the National Football League for the New England Patriots. He also was a football head coach at Ramapo College. He played college football at Colgate University

Early years
Goepel attended River Dell Regional High School, where he practiced football, basketball and baseball. He accepted a football scholarship from Colgate University, where he was coached by Neil Wheelwright.

As a sophomore, he was a backup at quarterback behind Ron Burton. As a junior, he was named the starter at quarterback, posting 88-of-182 completions for 1,196 yards, 7 touchdowns and 11 interceptions.

As a senior, he completed 137-of-309 completions for 1,802 yards, 15 touchdowns and 19 interceptions. He also was the team's placekicker, making his only field goal attempt and 16 out of 17 extra point conversions.

Goepel finished his college career with 258-of-547 completions for 3,336 yards, 25 touchdowns and 34 interceptions. He also set 9 school records, including passing ards, total offense and punting.

He played first base on the baseball team, where he batted .360 as a senior.

Professional career
Goepel was selected by the Dallas Cowboys in the 12th round (311th overall) of the 1971 NFL Draft. He was waived on September 7. It was reported in the media that after he was cut, the Washington Redskins invited Goepel for a tryout, that turned into an interrogation session by then head coach George Allen, to obtain information about the Cowboys offense.

In 1972, he was signed as a free agent by the New England Patriots. He was the team's third-string quarterback and spent the season on the taxi squad. He was released on July 26, 1973.

Coaching career
Goepel was the quarterback and receiver coach at River Dell Regional High School from 1976 to 1979. He served as the head football coach at Ramapo College from 1981 to 1984, compiling a record of 23–12–2.

Head coaching record

References

1949 births
Living people
American football quarterbacks
Baseball first basemen
Colgate Raiders baseball players
Colgate Raiders football players
New England Patriots players
Ramapo Roadrunners football coaches
High school football coaches in New Jersey
People from Teaneck, New Jersey
River Dell Regional High School alumni
Sportspeople from Bergen County, New Jersey
Players of American football from New Jersey
Baseball players from New Jersey